Walnut Hills Cemetery may refer to:

 Walnut Hills Cemetery (Cincinnati)
 Walnut Hills Cemetery (Brookline, Massachusetts)
 Walnut Hills Cemetery (Petersburg, Indiana)
 Walnut Hill Cemetery (Council Bluffs, Iowa)